= ToursByLocals =

Canadian international private tour provider

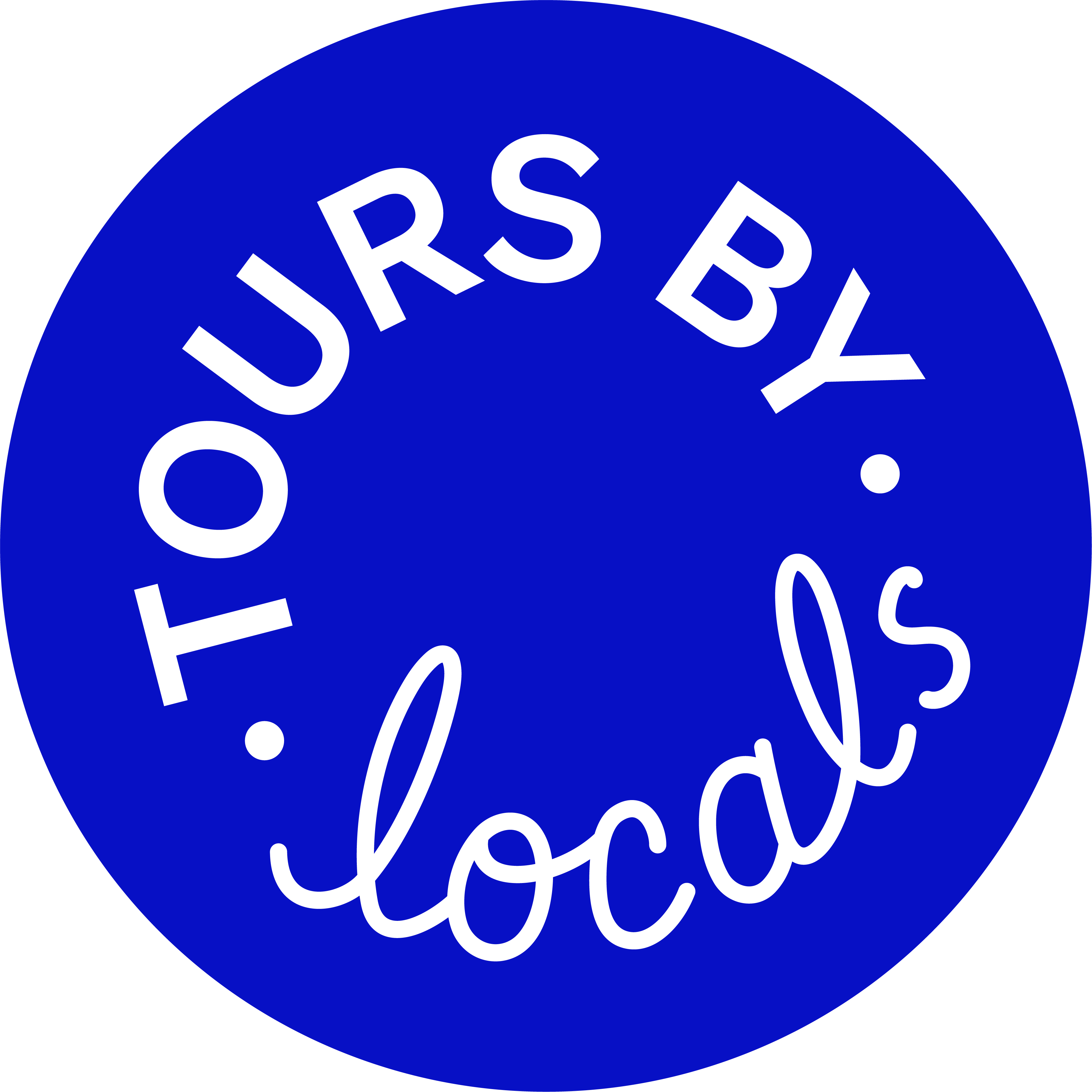
- Type: Tour Operator
- Industry: Tourism
- Founded: 2008 in Vancouver, British Columbia, Canada
- Founder: Paul Melhus (Co-Founder), Dave Vincent (Co-Founder)
- Headquarters: Vancouver, British Columbia, Canada
- Key people: Lisa Chen (President and CEO)
- Products: Private tours, local travel experiences
- Services: private guided tours, shore excursions
- Number of employees: 165 (approximately) (January 2025)
- Website: toursbylocals.com

ToursByLocals is a Canadian-based, international private tour provider. Headquartered in Vancouver, the company connects travelers with more than 5,000 private tour guides in over 175 countries.

It provides services like shore excursions for cruise ship passengers.

== History ==
ToursByLocals was founded in 2008 by Paul Melhus and Dave Vincent.

The company had operated without outside investment for approximately twelve years prior to the 2020 funding round, relying on revenue to fund its growth.

In January 2020, ToursByLocals announced US$33 million (approximately C$43 million) in series A funding with Austin, Texas-based growth capital fund Tritium Partners.

The planned technology and brand overhaul funded by the Series A was disrupted by the COVID-19 pandemic, which began approximately two months after the funding closed. During the pandemic period, ToursByLocals focused on providing virtual tours and domestic tours as an alternative to in-person international travel.

By 2024, the company completed the rebranding and a full re-platforming of its technology infrastructure.

== Operations ==
ToursByLocals operates as an online marketplace connecting travellers with independent local tour guides. The company provides private tours, with bookings from separate parties not combined into shared groups. It also provides services for cruise ship passengers.

== Leadership ==
Paul Melhus was chief executive officer from the company's founding until October 2023. Dave Vincent was CTO and co-founded the company alongside Melhus in 2008. In October 2023, Lisa Chen was appointed President and Chief Executive Officer, and Melhus assumed the role of Executive Chairman.
